Kau To Shan, also known as Cove Hill, is a  tall mountain located in Sha Tin District, in Hong Kong's New Territories.

Residential area 
The Kau To Shan mountain area was the source of reclamation sand used for the construction of the Sha Tin Racecourse in the 1970s. Currently, this area, also referred to as Kau To Shan, primarily consists of low-rise, upmarket residences.

See also 
 List of mountains, peaks and hills in Hong Kong
 Kau To Village
 Ma Niu Village
 Fo Tan
 Sha Tin

References